Kachkinovo (Qasqın) is a rural locality (a village) in Yelbulaktamaksky Selsoviet, Bizhbulyaksky District, Bashkortostan, Russia. The population was 190 as of 2010. There are 3 streets.

Geography 
Kachkinovo is located 28 km south of Bizhbulyak (the district's administrative centre) by road. Yelbulaktamak is the nearest rural locality.

References 

Rural localities in Bizhbulyaksky District